Mandili may refer to:

 Mandılı, a village in Azerbaijan
 , a village in Nea Zichni, Greece
 Trio Mandili, a Georgian music group

See also 
 Anthony Mandile, American politician